The Parauapebas River is a river of Pará state in north-central Brazil. It is a tributary of the Itacaiúnas River, which in turn is a tributary of the Tocantins River.

The Parauapebas River is a blackwater river.
Its basin is in the Xingu–Tocantins–Araguaia moist forests ecoregion.

See also
List of rivers of Pará

References

Rivers of Pará